Walk Proud is a 1979 American hood drama film directed by Robert L. Collins and written by Evan Hunter and starring Robby Benson, Sarah Holcomb, Henry Darrow, Pepe Serna, Trinidad Silva and Ji-Tu Cumbuka. It was released on June 15, 1979, by Universal Pictures.

Premise
A young Chicano gang member in Los Angeles comes to realize that the gang life is not what he really wants but doesn't know how to get out.

Robby Benson plays Emilio, a young gang member in Los Angeles who begins to question his gang life when he meets and starts to fall for a girl who encourages him to try and leave. Emilio, with great pride in his Mexican heritage, suffers a further identity crisis upon meeting his father, a white American who got his mother pregnant when she was just 16.

Cast 
  
Robby Benson as Emilio Mendez
Sarah Holcomb as Sarah Lassiter
Henry Darrow as Mike Serrano
Pepe Serna as Cesar
Trinidad Silva as Dagger
Ji-Tu Cumbuka as Sgt. Gannett
Lawrence Pressman as Henry Lassiter
Domingo Ambriz as Cowboy
Brad Sullivan as Jerry Kelsey
Irene DeBari as Mrs. Mendez 
Eloy Casados as Hugo 
Daniel Faraldo as El Tigre
Tony Alvarenga as Paco
Aesop Aquarian as Hippo 
Benjie Bancroft as Police Guard
Gary Carlos Cervantes as Carlos 
Tim Culbertson as Police Guard
Lee Fraser as Johnny
Panchito Gómez as Manuel 
Joe Jacobs as Store Owner 
Bill Lopresto as Ice Cream Vendor
Claudio Martínez as Vincente 
Rod Masterson as Policeman #2
Patricia A. Morales as Church Singer
Dennis O'Flaherty as Policeman #1
Rose Portillo as Katie
Luis Reyes as El Español
Eduardo Ricard as Priest
Ángel Salazar as Angel
Judith Searle as Abigail Lassiter
Tony Steinhart as Interrogation Officer
Felipe Turich as Prayer Maker 
Jose Ramiro Salazar as an unidentified gang member

See also 
 List of hood films

References

External links
 
 
 

1979 films
American drama films
1979 drama films
Universal Pictures films
Films directed by Robert L. Collins
1970s English-language films
Hood films
1970s American films
Films with screenplays by Evan Hunter